Austrotoma is a genus of sea snails, marine gastropod mollusks, unassigned to a family within the superfamily Conoidea.

Species
Species within the genus Austrotoma include:
 Austrotoma aguayoi (Carcelles, 1953)
 Austrotoma ampla Powell, 1942 †
 Austrotoma clifdenica Powell, 1942 †
 Austrotoma cryptoconoidea Powell, 1942 †
 Austrotoma deducta Marwick, 1931 †
 Austrotoma echinata Powell, 1942 †
 Austrotoma excavata (Suter, 1917) †
 Austrotoma eximia (Suter, 1917) †
 Austrotoma finlayi Powell, 1938 †
 Austrotoma gemmulata Powell, 1942 †
 Austrotoma gracilicostata (Zittel, 1865) †
 Austrotoma hurupiensis Dell, 1952 †
 Austrotoma inaequabilis Marwick, 1929 †
 Austrotoma indiscreta Finlay & Marwick, 1937 †
 Austrotoma kaiparaensis Powell, 1942 †
 Austrotoma lawsi Powell, 1942 †
 Austrotoma minor (Finlay, 1924) †
 Austrotoma molinei Marwick, 1931 †
 Austrotoma neozelanica (Suter, 1913) †
 Austrotoma nervosa Powell, 1942 †
 Austrotoma obsoleta Finlay, 1926 †
 Austrotoma prolixa Laws, 1940 †
 Austrotoma suteri (Cossmann, 1916) †
 Austrotoma toreuma Marwick, 1929 †
Species brought into synonymy
 Austrotoma scopalveus Finlay, 1926 † : synonym of Austrotoma minor (Finlay, 1924) †

References

External links
 Finlay H. J. (1924). The molluscan fauna of Target Gully: Part 1. Transactions of the New Zealand Institute. 55: 495-516